This is a list of flags that are used exclusively in Cornwall, or by the Cornish people, a recognised national minority of the United Kingdom.

Flag

Royal standards

Peerage

Regional flags

Religious flags

Historical flags

Organisations

Ensigns

See also

List of flags of the United Kingdom

Notes

Cornwall
Flags